Mariska Huisman (born 23 November 1983) is a Dutch marathon skater and speed skater. She was the first winner of a mass start worldcup in Astana.
At this moment she is the number 2 on the world ranking list.

She won the 2011–12 mass start World Cup with a total of 320 points. She did not start in the 2013 national championship mass start on 30 December 2013 due to the untimely death of her brother Sjoerd Huisman a few hours beforehand. Sjoerd was also a marathon skater and his death was the reason the event was cancelled.

Personal records

References

1983 births
Living people
Dutch female speed skaters
People from Andijk
World Single Distances Speed Skating Championships medalists
Sportspeople from North Holland
20th-century Dutch women
21st-century Dutch women